The Akron Tennis Open was a women's tennis tournament played on indoor carpet courts at the University of Akron Memorial Hall in Akron, Ohio in the United States and was part of the 1974 Virginia Slims circuit. It was the second edition of the tournament and was held from March 18 through March 24, 1974. Billie Jean King won the singles title and the accompanying $10,000 first-prize money.

Finals

Singles
 Billie Jean King defeated  Nancy Gunter 6–3, 7–5

Doubles
 Rosemary Casals /  Billie Jean King defeated  Julie Heldman /  Olga Morozova 6–2, 6–4

References

Virginia Slims of Akron
Virginia Slims of Akron
Tennis tournaments in Ohio
Virginia Slims of Akron
Virginia Slims of Akron